Go, Single Lady is a 2014 Chinese-Taiwanese co-produced television series starring Ady An and Mike He. It was first broadcast on 6 July 2014 in Mainland China on ZJTV with 27 episodes. Taiwan broadcast of the series began on 23 August 2014 under the title My Pig Lady (Chinese: 上流俗女) on CTV with 24 episodes.

Synopsis
Wang Man Ling (Ady An) is a crass young lady who is the daughter of a wealthy pig farmer. When a failed attempt to get her longtime boyfriend Peter to propose marriage to her at a friends wedding reception ends with him dumping her, she makes a promise to him and all their friends that she will find a guy more handsome and wealthier than him to marry her. Her first step into finding the guy is have her best friend Gao Tou Wen who works at a matchmaking service introduce her to guys on blind dates, but none seem to fit her requirements and each date ends with her flipping the table.

Fan Jiang Yu (Mike He) is a second generation heir who lives off of his father's wealth. He lives extravagantly and doesn't have a care on how he spends his money. Due to his father's death, their company stocks drops overnight leaving him almost broke.

The two meet by accident when Man Ling thinks Jiang Yu is the absolute last blind date Tou Wen will set her up on, while Jiang Yu thinks Man Ling is an artiste that he has to piss off to cut ties with his parents charity. Wanting to prove to her dad and Tou Wen that this blind date won't end with her flipping the table, she holds her temper while taking insults from Jiang Yu. Jiang Yu, seeing how he isn't getting any reactions from Man Ling, decides to flip the table and end their meeting. Mad that Jiang Yu had insulted her, Man Ling decides to stalk him outside the men's room and give him a beat down.

Once their confusion is cleared that he isn't really her blind date and she isn't the artiste mooching from his charity, the two make a deal where he will teach her how to act and dress like the rich in exchange for her paying him.

Cast

Main
Ady An as Wang Man Ling
Daughter of a wealthy pig farmer. She is crass, dresses and lives modestly.
Mike He as Fan Jiang Yu
A second generation heir who has never really worked a day in his life. He spends carelessly and drives recklessly in his convertible around Taipei. His life is changed overnight when his father's company stocks drops and he is left broke.
Shin as He Wei Cheng
Wang Man Ling's childhood friend and Li Ya Zi's ex-boyfriend. He is a doctor that is treating Fan Jiang Yu's father. 
Zhang Xianzi as Li Ya Zi
Fan Jiang Yu's girlfriend and He Wei Cheng's ex-girlfriend. She is a high-end women's clothing designer. She is also materialistic and stays with Jiang Yu because of his father's wealth. 
Fu Xinbo as Zhang Kai Jie

Supporting
He Yi-hang as Wang Ji
Wang Man Ling's father and owner of a mass pig company.
Lin Mei-hsiu as Mei Shun
Kuo Tzu-chien as He Bo 
Ai Wei as Fan Jiang Rong 
Vicky Chen as Xu Xi Lei 
Amanda Chou as Zhou Xiao Han
Titan Huang as Xiao Sa 
Ah Ben as Ah Bu
Elaine Wan as Fang Fang Fang 
Chung Hsin-Ling as Gao Tou Wen 
Shone An as Feng Da Wei

Special appearance
Ken Lin as Peter 
Apple Lin as Presenter
Antony Kuo as Mars
Angus Kuo as Kevin

Soundtrack

Broadcast

Ratings

ZJTV

CTV

References

External links
CTV website 
ZJTV website

Taiwanese drama television series
2014 Taiwanese television series debuts
China Television original programming
Gala Television original programming
2014 Chinese television series debuts
2014 Chinese television series endings
Chinese romantic comedy television series
Television shows set in China
Zhejiang Television original programming